Larissa Schaerer (born 15 April 1975) is a former professional tennis player from Paraguay.

Biography
A right-handed player, Schaerer was born in Asuncion and began playing tennis aged eight. She was a member of the Paraguayan team that finished runner-up to Germany at the 1991 World Youth Cup, during which she was unbeaten in singles play. While still a junior, she started her Fed Cup career for Paraguay, first appearing at the age of 16, including in a World Group tie against the Soviet Union. At the 1992 US Open, she reached the semifinals of the girls' singles.

Schaerer represented Paraguay at the 1992 Summer Olympics. She competed in the women's doubles tournament with Rossana de los Ríos as her partner. The pair lost to the French pairing of Isabelle Demongeot and Nathalie Tauziat in the opening round.

On the WTA Tour, her best performances came on the clay courts of the Copa Colsanitas in Bogotá, where she was a semifinalist in 1998 and quarterfinalist in 1999.

It was in doubles that Schaerer made her only main-draw appearance in Grand Slam competition. At the 1999 Wimbledon Championships, she and partner Alina Jidkova lost in the qualifying event but entered the draw as lucky losers. They were beaten in the first round by 12th seeds Mary Joe Fernández and Monica Seles.

Schaerer made her last Fed Cup appearance in 2004. She featured in a total of 55 ties, for 64 wins overall, 39 in singles and 25 in doubles. These all remain national records for Paraguay.

ITF Circuit finals

Singles: 16 (11–5)

Doubles: 26 (13–13)

References

External links
 
 
 

1975 births
Living people
Paraguayan female tennis players
Olympic tennis players of Paraguay
Tennis players at the 1992 Summer Olympics
Sportspeople from Asunción
20th-century Paraguayan women
21st-century Paraguayan women